
Gmina Zaleszany is a rural gmina (administrative district) in Stalowa Wola County, Subcarpathian Voivodeship, in south-eastern Poland.

Villages
Gmina Zaleszany contains the villages and settlements of Agatówka, Dzierdziówka, Kąt, Kępie Zaleszańskie, Kotowa Wola, Majdan Zbydniowski, Motycze Szlacheckie, Obojnia, Ostrówek Duży, Ostrówek Mały, Pilchów, Ruska Wieś, Skowierzyn, Turbia, Wólka Turebska, Zajeziorze, Zaleszany and Zbydniów.

Neighbouring gminas
Gmina Zaleszany is bordered by the town of Stalowa Wola and by the gminas of Gorzyce, Grębów and Radomyśl nad Sanem.

References

Polish official population figures 2006

Zaleszany
Stalowa Wola County